Siri Siri Muvva is a 1976 Indian Telugu-language drama film written and directed by K. Viswanath. It stars Jaya Prada and Chandra Mohan.  K. Viswanath later remade the film with his leading lady Jaya Prada, as Sargam, in 1979. Siri Siri Muvva was screened at the International Film Festival of India, and Moscow International Film Festival, and has received two National Film Awards.

Plot 
Hyma (Jaya Pradha) is a mute girl who is passionate about dancing. She is ill-treated by her stepmother (Ramaprabha), who wants to make her daughter Savithri (Kavitha) a heroine. Sambayya (Chandramohan), an orphan, is deeply in love with Hyma, and saves her from being cheated by her vile stepmother and her nephew, Badram (Devadas Kanakala).

Sambayya takes Hyma to the city after her father's (Satyanarayana) death, where he is afflicted by TB. Hyma earns money by dancing at a Kalakshetra. Sambayya wants her to marry the organizer Ram Babu, but Hyma's heart beats only for her loyal companion Sambayya. Savithri acts in a movie and is shunned by all, and Hyma takes care of them. All is forgiven. Sambayya and Hyma get married, and all's well that ends well.

Cast 

 Jaya Prada as Hyma
 Chandra Mohan as Sambayya
 Kaikala Satyanarayana as Rudraiah, Hyma's father
 Kavitha as Savithri
 Ramaprabha as Tripura, Hyma's stepmother
 Devadas Kanakala as Bhadram
 Nirmalamma
 J. V. Ramana Murthi
 Allu Ramalingaiah
 Sakshi Ranga Rao

Songs
All songs written by Veturi.
 "Andaaniki Andam Ee Puttadibomma" (Singer: S. P. Balasubrahmanyam)
 "Eavarikevaru Ee Lokamlo Evariki Eruka" (Singer: S. P. Balasubrhamanyam)
 "Gajje Ghallumantuntae Gunde Jhallumantundi" (Singer: S. P. Balasubrahmanyam)
 "Jhummandhi Nadam Saiyyandi Padam" (Singers: P. Susheela, S. P. Balasubrahmanyam)
 "Maa Voori Devudamma" (Singers: S. P. Balasubrahmanyam, Pattabhi)
 "Odupunna Pilupu Odigunna Pulupu" (Singers: P. Susheela, S. P. Balasubrahmanyam)
 "Raa Digiraa Divinunchi Bhuviki Digiraa" (Singer: S. P. Balasubrahmanyam)
 "Godaralle Ennetlo Godaralle" (Singers: P. Susheela, S. P. Balasubrahmanyam)
 "Pilicahanu Eduta Nilichanu" (Singers: P. Susheela, S. P. Balasubrahmanyam)

Awards
 National Film Award for Best Female Playback Singer - P. Susheela
 National Film Award for Best Editing - K. Babu Rao

References

External links
 

1976 films
1970s Telugu-language films
Indian dance films
Films directed by K. Viswanath
Telugu films remade in other languages
Films scored by K. V. Mahadevan
Films whose editor won the Best Film Editing National Award